Saint Francis Receiving the Stigmata is an oil and tempera painting by Gentile da Fabriano, executed c. 1420, now in the Magnani-Rocca Foundation in the Province of Parma in Italy. It is the back of a processional banner - the front showing the Coronation of the Virgin is now in the Getty Center in Los Angeles. 

The banner was painted for a confraternity based at the San Francesco Monastery in Fabriano, the painter's birthplace - he had returned there from Brescia for a few months in spring 1420 before moving on to Florence. Ambrogio de' Bizochis was probably the intermediary between the painter and the confraternity - he was cousin to Egidio, brother of Gentile's wife.

References

Paintings by Gentile da Fabriano
Paintings in the collection of the Magnani-Rocca Foundation
Paintings of Francis of Assisi
1420s paintings